Wojnówko may refer to:
 Wojnówko, Poznań County
 Wojnówko, Złotów County

See also 
 Wojnowo (disambiguation)